The Zogg Fire was a wildfire that burned  in southwestern Shasta County and northwestern Tehama County, California, in the United States as part of the severe 2020 California wildfire season. The fire was first reported on September 27, 2020 and was fully contained on October 13, 2020, during that period destroying much of the communities of Igo and Ono, resulting in 4 deaths and the destruction of 204 buildings.

Fire progression
The fire was first reported at 2:51 PM PDT on September 27, 2020. As of October 13, the Zogg fire had burned  and was fully contained.

Impacts
The fire, which started at Zogg Mine Road and Jenny Bird Lane, destroyed 204 buildings, including multiple historic buildings in Ono, and killed four people as of October 13, 2020.

Most of Shasta County west of Clear Creek between Whiskeytown Lake and Highway 36, including Igo, Ono, Platina, Happy Valley, and Whiskeytown National Recreation Area, were evacuated.

A mobile registration van was set up at the Igo Ono School in November 2020, to help victims register for FEMA disaster relief. The van also provided victims with information and Right of Entry forms to help begin the clean up process for their homes.

Three orphaned mountain lions were released from care and moved to an exhibit at the Columbus Zoo and Aquarium in December 2020. The cubs had been discovered separately by firefighters, during the fire and at least one was mistaken for a household cat.

Investigation
On October 8, 2020, equipment from the Pacific Gas and Electric Company was seized as part of an ongoing investigation into the company’s role in the fire. On October 13, a judge asked the PG&E to explain their role in the fire.

It was announced on November 23 that remains of a grey pine tree that was near the area that the fire began had been seized by state fire investigators as evidence whether the tree was a part of the start of the fire. The tree reportedly had been potentially identified for removal, but had not been removed after the Carr Fire in 2018.

In March 2021, investigations concluded the fire began when a grey pine tree fell on power lines belonging to the Pacific Gas and Electric Company (PG&E).

Litigation 
The Zogg Fire and PG&E's role in its ignition prompted multiple lawsuits against the company.

In 2021, the California Public Utilities Commission proposed fining PG&E more than $155 million for its failure to remove the grey pine.

Cal Fire civil lawsuit 
In February 2022, Cal Fire filed a lawsuit against PG&E, seeking reimbursement for approximately $33 million in fire suppression costs and legal fees.

Shasta County criminal charges 
On September 24, 2021, the Shasta County District Attorney's Office filed criminal charges against PG&E, alleging involuntary manslaughter as one of 31 total charges. On February 1, 2023, a Shasta County judge dismissed 20 charges but ruled that there was sufficient evidence for PG&E to face trial for the remaining 11 felony and misdemeanor charges, including involuntary manslaughter. PG&E was scheduled for arraignment on February 15. Individual company employees and officials have not been charged, and so if found guilty PG&E would face fines and court-ordered corrective measures.

References

2020 California wildfires
History of Shasta County, California
History of Tehama County, California
October 2020 events in the United States
September 2020 events in the United States
Wildfires in Shasta County, California
Wildfires in Tehama County, California